Volleyball events were contested at the 1993 Central American and Caribbean Games in Ponce, Puerto Rico, Puerto Rico.

Medal summary

References
 Central American and Caribbean Games volleyball medalists

1993 Central American and Caribbean Games
1993
1993 in volleyball
International volleyball competitions hosted by Puerto Rico